Alfred Robertson may refer to:

 Alfred J. Robertson (1891–1948), American sportsman, coach, and college athletics administrator
 Alfred M. Robertson (1911–1975), horse racing jockey in American Thoroughbred 
 Alfred W. Robertson (1891-1958), California State Assemblyman